Stugeta carpenteri, the Carpenter's sapphire, is a species of butterfly in the family Lycaenidae. It is found in eastern Kenya. The habitat consists of arid savanna.

Adults of both sexes are attracted to flowers.

The larvae feed on Oncocalyx fischeri and Emelianthe panganensis.

Etymology
It is named for Hale Carpenter.

References

Butterflies described in 1946
Iolaini